Samuel E. Gandy, M.D., Ph.D. is a neurologist, cell biologist, Alzheimer's disease  (AD) researcher and expert in the metabolism of the sticky substance called amyloid that clogs the brain in patients with Alzheimer's. His team discovered the first drugs that could lower the formation of amyloid.

As of 2020, he is Mount Sinai Professor of Alzheimer's Disease Research, professor of neurology and psychiatry, Icahn School of Medicine at Mount Sinai, director, Center for Cognitive Health and NFL Neurological Center Mount Sinai Hospital, visiting principal research fellow, South Australia Health and Medical Research Institute in Adelaide, SA, Australia, and chairman emeritus of the National Medical and Scientific Advisory Council of the Alzheimer's Association. He was also founding director, Farber Institute for the Neurosciences.

Research
Gandy has written more than 250 peer-reviewed papers, chapters and reviews on this topic. He has received continuous National Institutes of Health (NIH) funding for his research on amyloid metabolism since 1986. He holds four patents that can be implemented to regulate key proteins, inhibiting Alzheimer-type amyloidosis and a diagnostic method for Alzheimer disease, Huntington's disease, Parkinson's disease, dystonia ataxia, schizophrenia, epilepsy, brain tumors, brain irradiation, head trauma, and acute and chronic encephalitic and vascular disease. Gandy also studies brain imaging as a tool to confirm chronic traumatic encephalopathy (CTE) in retired athletes and war Veterans during their lifetimes.

Patents
Use of phosphoprotein patterns for diagnosis of neurological and psychiatric disorders, (1989).
Treatment of amyloidosis associated with Alzheimer disease, (1993).
Method of screening for modulators of amyloid formation, (1994).
Treatment of amyloidosis associated with Alzheimer disease using modulators of protein phosphorylation, (1995).

Grants 
Gandy worked on 36 research grants, 18 as principal investigator, since 1986. As of 2020, he works on nine active grants.

Partial list of active grants in 2020:

Editorialships and boards
As of 2020, Gandy is on the editorial boards of Neurodegenerative Diseases, Journal of Neuroinflammation and The Journal of Biological Chemistry. He is an associate editor at Alzheimer’s Disease and Associated Disorders and Journal of Neuroinflammation.

Publications
Gandy has an h-index of 83 in 2020; a partial list of peer-reviewed publications include:

Biography 
Gandy received his MD and PhD at the Medical University of South Carolina.

He did his postgraduate work at the Columbia University College of Physicians & Surgeons and Cornell University Medical College. Gandy completed his post-doctorate at Rockefeller University, where he was appointed assistant professor in the laboratory of Paul Greengard, 2000 Laureate of the Nobel Prize in Physiology or Medicine.

Gandy was appointed associate professor of neurology and neurosciences at Cornell University Medical College in 1992. In 1997, he moved to New York University where he served as professor of psychiatry and cell biology until his appointment as Paul C. Brucker, M.D., Professor of Neuroscience at Jefferson Medical College and Director of the Farber Institute for Neurosciences in 2001. In July 2007, he assumed his current post as Sinai Professor of Alzheimer’s Disease Research at the Mount Sinai School of Medicine. He is also a member of the Research Consortium of the Cure Alzheimer's Fund.

In 2009, Gandy was featured with other prominent research scientists as one of GQ's "Rockstars of Science"   and featured in the documentary film I Remember Better When I Paint that examines the phenomenon of how the creative arts awaken pathways to emotional parts of the brain.

References

External links
When It Isn’t Really Senility, New York Times March 2009
 The Future of Detecting Brain Damage in Football, The Atlantic September 2017

Living people
Alzheimer's disease researchers
Year of birth missing (living people)